Payam is a village and Grama Panchayat in Iritty taluk of Kannur district in Indian state of Kerala.

Demographics
As of 2011 Census, Payam village had a population of 15,429 with 7,425 males and 8,004 females. In Payam, 9.9% of the population was under 6 years of age. Payam had overall literacy of 94.9% where male literacy stands at 97.4% and female literacy was 92.7%.
Payam Grama Panchayat consists of two revenue villages like Payam and Vilamana.

Transportation
National Highway 66 passes through Thalassery town which connects Goa and Mumbai in the northern side and Kochi and Thiruvananthapuram on the southern side. Thalassery-Coorg interstate highway (SH-30) passes through Payam provides access to cities and towns of neighbouring Karnataka state.
The nearest railway station is Thalassery in Shoranur-Mangalore Section under southern railway. 
The nearest airport is Kannur International Airport of about 23 km away.

References

Villages near Iritty
Villages in Kannur district